The Indian High School is a CBSE-affiliated Indian school in Dubai, United Arab Emirates. It was established in 1961 to provide education to the children of Indian expatriates and was the first expatriate educational institution in the UAE. The school is one of the small number of not-for-profit schools in the emirate, and is rated "Very Good" by Dubai's KHDA. It is the oldest, largest educational institution in the Persian Gulf region.

History
The Indian High School was founded in 1961 by Maghanmal Pancholia with a view of providing education to the children of Indian expats. It was the first expatriate educational institution to be established in Dubai. The land for the school was granted by the then ruler of Dubai, Sheikh Rashid bin Saeed Al Maktoum. The initial enrollment was 8 students; it has since grown to more than 15,000 across all three campuses, including 370 students with special needs. The school has about 600 teachers.

Location
The school has three campuses. The Junior School at Al Garhoud accommodates Pre-Primary classes (girls and boys KG1–Grade 4). The Senior School in Oud Metha includes girls' Grades 5 to 12, who commence in the early morning shift (7:00am to 2:00pm), boys' Grades 5 to 12, who commence in the late morning shift (9:10am to 4:00pm).

The school had adopted a new initiative, called Rahhal ('traveller' in Arabic), which provided the senior section with a 4-day week, rather than the original 5 day week for their junior counterparts. The Grades 11 & 12, both boys and girls, operated in the Rahhal shift (7:00am to 4:00pm) on alternating days. The initiative was implemented on 3 students in 2018 and then in 2019 it was implemented on all students of grade 11 & 12. It was later cancelled in August 2022 after numerous complaints from parents and students about long school hours that were implemented due to the new 2022 4-day weekday in UAE.

The school also operates the Indian International School (IIS DSO), located in Dubai Silicon Oasis.

The Oud Metha Metro Station on the Green Line is located near the senior school campus, and the GGICO Metro Station on the Red Line is located next to the Junior School campus. The school also has a fleet of buses to transport students and staff.

A government hospital and a church are located on the road opposite the main campus, while a private hospital is located behind the junior school.

KHDA Inspection Report
The Knowledge and Human Development Authority (KHDA) is an educational quality assurance authority based in Dubai, United Arab Emirates. It undertakes early learning, school and higher learning institution management and rates them as well.
Following is a summary of the inspection ratings for the Indian High School, Dubai. Its current ratings have since slipped from Outstanding to Very Good.

A summary of ratings for all schools in Dubai can be found online. (Note: Outstanding ranked schools do not have a KHDA report for the 2016–2017 school year.)

Achievements
The school has acquired membership of Dubai Quality Group and has acquired ISO : 9001 : 2000 Certification. It has also received the Sheikh Hamdan bin Rashid Al Maktoum Award for Distinguished School and School Administration twice, in 2002 and  2005.

The school won the eIndia 2012 awards for the No. 1 "ICT Enabled school of year" in the category of "digital learning".

Notable alumni 
Manasa Radhakrishnan - Actress
Deepak Dev - Music Composer
Methil Devika - Classical Dance Exponent, Research Supervisor and Cultural Interpreter
S. J. Suryah - Director, Screenwriter, Actor, Composer and Producer
Japinder Kaur - Director
Sabbah Haji - Educator, Social Worker
Arushee Wahi - Swimmer
Tanisha Crasto - Badminton Player

References

External links

 Official website
 Light House

Educational institutions established in 1961
1961 establishments in the British Empire
1960s establishments in the Trucial States
International schools in Dubai
Indian international schools in the United Arab Emirates
Round Square schools